Bainbridge is the name of some places in the U.S. state of Ohio:
Bainbridge Township, Geauga County, Ohio
Bainbridge (CDP), Ohio, a census-designated place in Bainbridge Township
Bainbridge, Ross County, Ohio